The 1961–62 Hellenic Football League season was the ninth in the history of the Hellenic Football League, a football competition in England.

Premier Division

The Premier Division featured 15 clubs which competed in the division last season, along with two new clubs:
Chipping Norton Town, promoted from Division One
Yiewsley reserves

League table

Division One

The Division One featured 9 clubs which competed in the division last season, along with 3 new clubs:
Lambourn Sports
East Hendred
Faringdon Town

League table

References

External links
 Hellenic Football League

1961-62
H